Cymindis pilosissima is a species of ground beetle in the subfamily Harpalinae. It was described by Reitter in 1894.

References

pilosissima
Beetles described in 1894